La Fraternité, Journal moral et politique (English: The Brotherhood, Moral and Political Journal) was a socialist political journal founded in Paris in May 1841 by journalist Richard Lahautière.

History
It was for a brief time the primary publication of the pre-Marxist Neo-Babouvist movement. The movement was influenced by the revolutionary activities of Gracchus Babeuf and the writings of Philippe Buonarroti and supported radical Jacobin republicanism and economic collectivism. Unique among socialist publications of the early 1840s, La Fraternité was well informed about the burgeoning communist movement in the German states.

Lahautière retired as editor-in-chief in October 1841 and was replaced by a librarian named Pinault. The shoemaker and communist activist André Marie Savary was a frequent contributor to the journal.

References

Defunct political magazines published in France
French-language magazines
Magazines established in 1841
Magazines disestablished in 1843
Magazines published in Paris
Neo-Babouvism
Socialist magazines